Omorgus demarzi is a species of hide beetle in the subfamily Omorginae.

References

demarzi
Beetles described in 1958